FXX is a Canadian English-language discretionary service channel owned by Rogers Sports & Media, a division of Rogers Communications, and the FX Networks subsidiary of Walt Disney Television. Based on the U.S. cable network of the same name, FXX is devoted primarily to scripted comedies for young adults.

It launched on April 1, 2014, in both standard definition and high definition.

History
It was reported that Rogers had plans to launch a Canadian version of FXX, a younger-skewing spinoff of FX. Originally scheduled for January 2014, FXX's launch was later rescheduled to April 1, 2014. As part of the launch, several shows which previously aired on FX Canada moved to FXX. In addition, a Canadian version of the FXNOW app, which allows viewers to watch shows from FX and FXX, was launched. On the day of the launch, FX Canada's website was completely revamped to include program information from both FX-branded channels.

It was revealed through CRTC regulatory documents that the broadcast licence used to launch FXX was the licence originally granted for a proposed channel called Ampersand. That licence requires the channel's programming to be related to "romance, love and relationships".

Programming
As with the Canadian version of FX, any new series produced for FXX in the U.S and will air on this channel as well as reruns of Citytv and CBC originals to fulfill Canadian content requirements. In addition, FXX has also aired several original shows that premiered on FX in the U.S (namely Fargo, Married and You're the Worst).  Other programming from the U.S version of FXX, such as Archer, Cake and all of the shows from the former Animation Domination High-Def block, however, are notably absent. In the case of animated series, several of these shows have been acquired by Corus Entertainment for Adult Swim and the former Teletoon at Night block.

Current programming 

Current as of January 2023

Acquired from FX Networks
Dave
Dicktown
It's Always Sunny In Philadelphia
Little Demon

Other acquired shows
30 Rock
Brooklyn Nine-Nine
COPS
Hudson & Rex
Parks and Recreation

Former programming
Shows listed in bold are sourced from FX Networks.
Ali G: Rezurection
American Dad!
Bob's Burgers
Brand X with Russell Brand
The Bridge
Chozen
Da Vinci's City Hall
Da Vinci's Inquest
Eastbound & Down
Family Guy
Fargo
The League
Man Seeking Woman
Married
The Mindy Project
Modern Family
Murdoch Mysteries
The Office
Package Deal
Sons of Anarchy
Totally Biased with W. Kamau Bell
Two and a Half Men
You're the Worst

References

Rogers Communications
FX Networks
Digital cable television networks in Canada
English-language television stations in Canada
Television channels and stations established in 2014
2014 establishments in Canada
Comedy television networks